Wetetnagami Lake is a body of freshwater crossed by Wetetnagami River in the eastern part of Senneterre in the RCM La Vallée-de-l'Or Regional County Municipality, in the administrative region of Abitibi-Témiscamingue, in province of Quebec, in Canada. This stretch of water straddles the townships of Labrie and Moquin.

Forestry is the main economic activity of the sector. With the creation of the Wetetnagami Lake Protected Biodiversity Reserve, recreational and tourism activities are being developed. This lake is the heart of this reserve.

The Wetetnagami Lake watershed is accessible via a forest road that passes north of the lake and one that passes south near Lake Cemetery. Its surface is generally frozen from the beginning of December to the end of April.

Geography

Toponymy
The term "Holy Father" is a family name of French origin.

The toponym "Lake Wetetnagami" was formalized on December 5, 1968, by the Commission de toponymie du Québec when it was created.

Notes and references

See also 

Lakes of Abitibi-Témiscamingue
Nottaway River drainage basin